The Orange Revolution was a series of protests and political events that took place in Ukraine from late November 2004 to January 2005, in the immediate aftermath of the run-off vote of the 2004 Ukrainian presidential election, which was claimed to be marred by massive corruption, voter intimidation and electoral fraud. Kyiv, the Ukrainian capital, was the focal point of the movement's campaign of civil resistance, with thousands of protesters demonstrating daily. Nationwide, the revolution was highlighted by a series of acts of civil disobedience, sit-ins, and general strikes organized by the opposition movement.

The protests were prompted by reports from several domestic and foreign election monitors as well as the widespread public perception that the results of the run-off vote of 21 November 2004 between leading candidates Viktor Yushchenko and Viktor Yanukovych were rigged by the authorities in favour of the latter. The nationwide protests succeeded when the results of the original run-off were annulled, and a revote was ordered by Ukraine's Supreme Court for 26 December 2004. Under intense scrutiny by domestic and international observers, the second run-off was declared to be "free and fair". The final results showed a clear victory for Yushchenko, who received about 52% of the vote, compared to Yanukovych's 45%. Yushchenko was declared the official winner and with his inauguration on 23 January 2005 in Kyiv, the Orange Revolution ended. In the following years, the Orange Revolution had a negative connotation among pro-government circles in Belarus and Russia.

In the 2010 presidential election, Yanukovych became Yushchenko's successor as President of Ukraine after the Central Election Commission and international observers declared that the presidential election was conducted fairly. Yanukovych was ousted from power four years later following the February 2014 Euromaidan clashes in Kyiv's Independence Square. Unlike the bloodless Orange Revolution, these protests resulted in more than 100 deaths, occurring mostly between 18 and 20 February 2014.

Background

Gongadze assassination or Kuchmagate crisis
Georgiy Gongadze, a Ukrainian journalist and the founder of Ukrayinska Pravda (a newspaper well known for publicising the corruption or unethical conduct of Ukrainian politicians) was kidnapped and murdered in 2000. Though no one accused Ukrainian President Kuchma of personally murdering him, persistent rumours suggested that the President had ordered the killing. Gen. Oleksiy Pukach, a former police officer, was accused of the murder under the orders of a former minister who committed suicide in 2005. Pukach was arrested in 2010 and was sentenced to life in prison in 2013. This murder sparked a movement against Kuchma in 2000 that can be seen as the origin of the Orange Revolution in 2004. After two terms of presidency (1994-1999) and the Cassette Scandal of 2000 that ruined his image irreparably, Kuchma decided not to run for a third term in the 2004 elections and instead supported Prime Minister Viktor Yanukovych in the presidential race against Viktor Yushchenko of the Our Ukraine–People's Self-Defense Bloc.

Causes of the Orange Revolution
The state of Ukraine during the 2004 presidential election is considered an "ideal condition" for an outburst from the public. During this time Ukrainians were impatient while waiting for the economic and political transformation. The results of the election were thought to be fraudulent.

The Revolution empowered many Ukrainians to take to the streets and participate in the protests, some lasting as long as seventeen days. The protests did not have national participation, but mostly was joined by western and central Ukrainians. Ukraine gained independence in 1991 and it was the quest for that independence that supported the Orange Revolution. Ukrainians for the most part did not want to be too closely associated with the past history of the Soviet Union. The Austro-Hungarian roots in the eastern European geo-cultural area of Ukraine (formerly known as Poland-Lithuania) helped shape the modern day Ukrainian national identity.

Factors enabling the Orange Revolution 
The Ukrainian regime that was in power before the Orange Revolution created a path for a democratic society to emerge. It was based on a "competitive authoritarian regime" that is considered a "hybrid regime", allowing for a democracy and market economy to come to life. The election fraud emphasised the Ukrainian citizens' desire for a more pluralistic type of government.

The Cassette Scandal sparked the public's desire to create a social reform movement. It not only undermined the peoples' respect for Kuchma as a president but also for the elite ruling class in general. Because of Kuchma's scandalous behaviour, he lost many of his supporters with high ranking government positions. Many of the government officials who were on his side went on to fully support the election campaign of Yushchenko as well as his ideas in general.

After a clear lack of faith in the government had been instilled in the Ukrainian population, Yushchenko's role had never been more important to the revolution. Yushchenko was a charismatic candidate who showed no signs of being corrupt. Yuschenko was on the same level as his constituents and presented his ideas in a "non-Soviet" way. Young Ukrainian voters were extremely important to the outcome of the 2004 Presidential election. This new wave of younger people had different views of the main figures in Ukraine. They were exposed to a lot of negativity from the Kuchmagate and therefore had very skewed visions about Kuchma and his ability to lead their country.

The abundance of younger people who participated showed an increasing sense of nationalism that was developing in the country. The Orange Revolution had enough popular impact that it interested people of all ages.

Prelude to the Orange Revolution

Political alliances 
In late 2002, Viktor Yushchenko (Our Ukraine), Oleksandr Moroz (Socialist Party of Ukraine), Petro Symonenko (Communist Party of Ukraine) and Yulia Tymoshenko (Yulia Tymoshenko Bloc) issued a joint statement concerning "the beginning of a state revolution in Ukraine". The communists left the alliance: Symonenko opposed the idea of a single candidate from the alliance in the Ukrainian presidential election of 2004; but the other three parties remained allies until July 2006. (In the autumn of 2001 both Tymoshenko and Yushchenko had broached the idea of setting up such a coalition.)

On 2 July 2004 Our Ukraine and the Yulia Tymoshenko Bloc established the Force of the People, a coalition which aimed to stop "the destructive process that has, as a result of the incumbent authorities, become a characteristic for Ukraine" - at the time President Leonid Kuchma and Prime Minister Viktor Yanukovych were the "incumbent authorities" in Ukraine. The pact included a promise by Viktor Yushchenko to nominate Tymoshenko as Prime Minister if Yushchenko won the October 2004 presidential election.

2004 Ukraine presidential election campaign 
The 2004 presidential election in Ukraine eventually featured two main candidates:

 sitting Prime Minister Viktor Yanukovych, largely supported by Leonid Kuchma (the outgoing President of Ukraine who had already served two terms in office from 1994 and was precluded from running himself due to the constitutional term limits)
 the opposition candidate Viktor Yushchenko, leader of the Our Ukraine faction in the Ukrainian parliament and a former Prime Minister (in office 1999–2001)

The election took place in a highly charged atmosphere, with the Yanukovych team and the outgoing president's administration using their control of the government and state apparatus for intimidation of Yushchenko and his supporters. In September 2004 Yushchenko suffered dioxin poisoning under mysterious circumstances. While he survived and returned to the campaign trail, the poisoning undermined his health and altered his appearance dramatically (his face remains disfigured by the consequences ).

The two main candidates were neck and neck in the first-round vote held on 31 October 2004, winning 39.32% (Yanukovych) and 39.87% (Yushchenko) of the votes cast. The candidates who came third and fourth collected much less: Oleksandr Moroz of the Socialist Party of Ukraine and Petro Symonenko of the Communist Party of Ukraine received 5.82% and 4.97%, respectively. Since no candidate had won more than 50% of the cast ballots, Ukrainian law mandated a run-off vote between two leading candidates. After the announcement of the run-off, Oleksandr Moroz threw his support behind Viktor Yushchenko. The Progressive Socialist Party's Natalia Vitrenko, who won 1.53% of the vote, endorsed Yanukovych, who hoped for Petro Simonenko's endorsement but did not receive it.

In the wake of the first round of the election, many complaints emerged regarding voting irregularities in favour of the government-supported Yanukovych. However, as it was clear that neither nominee was close enough to collect an outright majority in the first round, challenging the initial result would not have affected the outcome of the round. So the complaints were not actively pursued and both candidates concentrated on the upcoming run-off, scheduled for 21 November.

Pora! activists were arrested in October 2004, but the release of many (reportedly on President Kuchma's personal order) gave growing confidence to the opposition.

Yushchenko's supporters originally adopted orange as the signifying colour of his election campaign. Later, the colour gave its name to an entire series of political labels, such as the Oranges (Pomaranchevi in Ukrainian) for his political camp and its supporters. At the time when the mass protests grew, and especially when they brought about political change in the country, the term Orange Revolution came to represent the entire series of events.

In view of the success of using colour as a symbol to mobilise supporters, the Yanukovych camp chose blue for themselves.

Protests

Protests began on the eve of the second round of voting, as the official count differed markedly from exit poll results which gave Yushchenko up to an 11% lead, while official results gave the election win to Yanukovych by 3%. While Yanukovych supporters have claimed that Yushchenko's connections to the Ukrainian media explain this disparity, the Yushchenko team publicised evidence of many incidents of electoral fraud in favour of the government-backed Yanukovych, witnessed by many local and foreign observers. These accusations were reinforced by similar allegations, though at a lesser scale, during the first presidential run of 31 October. 

The Yushchenko campaign publicly called for protest on the dawn of election day, 21 November 2004, when allegations of fraud began to spread in the form of leaflets printed and distributed by the 'Democratic Initiatives' foundation, announcing that Yushchenko had won – on the basis of its exit poll. Beginning on 22 November 2004, massive protests started in cities across Ukraine: the largest, in Kyiv's Maidan Nezalezhnosti (Independence Square), attracted an estimated 500,000 participants, who on 23 November 2004, peacefully marched in front of the headquarters of the Verkhovna Rada, the Ukrainian parliament, many wearing orange or carrying orange flags, the colour of Yushchenko's campaign coalition. One of the most prominent activists of that time was Paraska Korolyuk, subsequently bestowed with the Order of Princess Olga. From 22 November Pora! undertook the management of the protests in Kyiv until the end of the demonstration.

The local councils in Kyiv, Lviv, and several other cities passed, with the wide popular support of their constituency, a largely symbolic refusal to accept the legitimacy of the official election results, and Yushchenko took a symbolic presidential oath. This "oath" taken by Yushchenko in half-empty parliament chambers, lacking the quorum as only the Yushchenko-leaning factions were present, could not have any legal effect. But it was an important symbolic gesture meant to demonstrate the resolve of the Yushchenko campaign not to accept the compromised election results. In response, Yushchenko's opponents denounced him for taking an illegitimate oath, and even some of his moderate supporters were ambivalent about this act, while a more radical side of the Yushchenko camp demanded him to act even more decisively. Some observers argued that this symbolic presidential oath might have been useful to the Yushchenko camp should events have taken a more confrontational route. In such a scenario, this "presidential oath" Yushchenko took could be used to lend legitimacy to the claim that he, rather than his rival who tried to gain the presidency through alleged fraud, was a true commander-in-chief authorised to give orders to the military and security agencies.

At the same time, local officials in Eastern and Southern Ukraine, the stronghold of Viktor Yanukovych, started a series of actions alluding to the possibility of the breakup of Ukraine or an extra-constitutional federalisation of the country, should their candidate's claimed victory not be recognised. Demonstrations of public support for Yanukovych were held throughout Eastern Ukraine and some of his supporters arrived in Kyiv. In Kyiv the pro-Yanukovych demonstrators were far outnumbered by Yushchenko supporters, whose ranks were continuously swelled by new arrivals from many regions of Ukraine. The scale of the demonstrations in Kyiv was unprecedented. By many estimates, on some days they drew up to one million people to the streets, in freezing weather.

In total 18.4% of Ukrainians have claimed to have taken part in the Orange Revolution (across Ukraine).

Political developments

Although Yushchenko entered into negotiations with outgoing President Leonid Kuchma in an effort to peacefully resolve the situation, the negotiations broke up on 24 November 2004. Yanukovych was officially certified as the victor by the Central Election Commission, which itself was allegedly involved in falsification of electoral results by withholding the information it was receiving from local districts and running a parallel illegal computer server to manipulate the results. The next morning after the certification took place, Yushchenko spoke to supporters in Kyiv, urging them to begin a series of mass protests, general strikes and sit-ins with the intent of crippling the government and forcing it to concede defeat.

In view of the threat of illegitimate government acceding to power, Yushchenko's camp announced the creation of the Committee of National Salvation which declared a nationwide political strike.

On 1 December 2004, the Verkhovna Rada passed a resolution that strongly condemned pro-separatist and federalisation actions, and passed a non-confidence vote in the Cabinet of Ministers of Ukraine, a decision Prime Minister Yanukovych refused to recognise. By the Constitution of Ukraine, the non-confidence vote mandated the government's resignation, but the parliament had no means to enforce a resignation without the co-operation of Prime Minister Yanukovych and outgoing President Kuchma.

On 3 December 2004, Ukraine's Supreme Court finally broke the political deadlock. The court decided that due to the scale of the electoral fraud it became impossible to establish the election results. Therefore, it invalidated the official results that would have given Yanukovych the presidency. As a resolution, the court ordered a revote of the run-off to be held on 26 December 2004. This decision was seen as a victory for the Yushchenko camp while Yanukovych and his supporters favoured a rerun of the entire election rather than just the run-off, as a second-best option if Yanukovych was not awarded the presidency. On 8 December 2004 the parliament amended laws to provide a legal framework for the new round of elections. The parliament also approved the changes to the Constitution, implementing a political reform backed by outgoing President Kuchma as a part of a political compromise between the acting authorities and opposition.

In November 2009 Yanukovych stated that although his victory in the elections was "taken away", he gave up this victory in order to avoid bloodshed. "I didn't want mothers to lose their children and wives their husbands. I didn't want dead bodies from Kyiv to flow down the Dnipro. I didn't want to assume power through bloodshed."

Re-run election
The 26 December revote was held under the intense scrutiny by local and international observers. The preliminary results, announced by the Central Election Commission on 18 December, gave Yushchenko and Yanukovych 51.99% and 44.20% of the total vote which represented a change in the vote by +5.39% to Yushchenko and −5.27% from Yanukovych respectively when compared to the November poll. The Yanukovych team attempted to mount a fierce legal challenge to the election results using both the Ukrainian courts and the Election Commission complaint procedures. However, all their complaints were dismissed as without merit by both the Supreme Court of Ukraine and the Central Election Commission. On 10 January 2005 the Election Commission officially declared Yushchenko as the winner of the presidential election with the final results falling within 0.01% of the preliminary ones. This Election Commission announcement cleared the way for Yushchenko's inauguration as the President of Ukraine. The official ceremony took place in the Verkhovna Rada building on 23 January 2005 and was followed by the "public inauguration" of the newly sworn President at Maidan Nezalezhnosti (Independence Square) in front of hundreds of thousands of his supporters. This event brought the Ukrainian Orange Revolution to its peaceful conclusion.

Role of Ukrainian intelligence and security agencies
According to one version of events recounted by The New York Times, Ukrainian security agencies played an unusual role in the Orange Revolution, with a KGB successor agency in the former Soviet state providing qualified support to the political opposition. As per the paper report, on 28 November 2004 over 10,000 MVS (Internal Ministry) troops were mobilised to put down the protests in Independence Square in Kyiv by the order of their commander, Lt. Gen. Sergei Popkov. The SBU (Security Service of Ukraine, a successor to the KGB in Ukraine) warned opposition leaders of the crackdown. Oleksander Galaka, head of GUR (military intelligence) made calls to "prevent bloodshed". Col. Gen. Ihor Smeshko (SBU chief) and Maj. Gen. Vitaly Romanchenko (military counter-intelligence chief) both claimed to have warned Popkov to pull back his troops, which he did, preventing bloodshed.

In addition to the desire to avoid bloodshed, the New York Times article suggests that siloviki, as the security officers are often called in the countries of the former Soviet Union, were motivated by personal aversion to the possibility of having to serve President Yanukovych, who was in his youth convicted of robbery and assault and had alleged connection with corrupt businessmen, especially if he were to ascend to the presidency by fraud.  The personal feelings of Gen. Smeshko towards Yanukovych may also have played a role. Additional evidence of Yushchenko's popularity and at least partial support among the SBU officers is shown by the fact that several embarrassing proofs of electoral fraud, including incriminating wiretap recordings of conversations among the Yanukovych campaign and government officials discussing how to rig the election, were provided to the Yushchenko camp. These conversations were likely recorded and provided to the opposition by sympathisers in the Ukrainian Security Services.

According to Abel Polese, Kuchma was concerned about its reputation in the West; because of lack of natural resources to finance his regime he had to show a commitment to democracy in order to be targeted for Western financial assistance.

Internet usage
Throughout the demonstrations, Ukraine's emerging Internet usage (facilitated by news sites that began to disseminate the Kuchma tapes) was an integral part of the orange revolutionary process. It has even been suggested that the Orange Revolution was the first example of an Internet-organised mass protest. Analysts believe that the Internet and mobile phones allowed an alternative media to flourish that was not subject to self-censorship or overt control by President Kuchma and his allies and pro-democracy activists (such as Pora!) were able to use mobile phones and the Internet to coordinate election monitoring and mass protests.

2004 Ukrainian constitutional changes

As part of the Orange Revolution, the Ukrainian constitution was changed to shift powers from the presidency to the parliament. This was Oleksandr Moroz's price for his decisive role in winning Yushchenko the presidency. The Communists also supported these measures. These came into effect in 2006 during which Yanukovych's Party of Regions won the parliamentary election, creating a coalition government with the Socialists and the Communists under his leadership. As a result, President Viktor Yushchenko had to deal with a powerful Prime Minister Viktor Yanukovych who had control of many important portfolios. His premiership ended in late 2007 after Yushchenko had succeeded in his months-long attempt to dissolve parliament. After the election, Yanukovych's party again was the largest, but Tymoshenko's finished far ahead of Yushchenko's for second place. The Orange parties won a very narrow majority, permitting a new government under Tymoshenko, but Yushchenko's political decline continued to his poor showing in the 2010 presidential election.

On 1 October 2010, the Constitutional Court of Ukraine overturned the 2004 amendments, considering them unconstitutional.

2010 presidential election
A Circuit administrative court in Kyiv forbade mass actions at Maidan Nezalezhnosti from 9 January 2010 to 5 February 2010. The Mayor's office had requested this in order to avoid "nonstandard situations" during the aftermath of the 2010 presidential election. Apparently (in particular) the Party of Regions, All-Ukrainian Union "Fatherland" and Svoboda had applied for a permit to demonstrate there. Incumbent President Viktor Yushchenko got a dismal 5.45% of votes during the election.
"Ukraine is a European democratic country", said Yushchenko in a sort of political will at the polling station. "It is a free nation and free people." According to him, this is one of the great achievements of the Orange Revolution.

In the 2010 presidential election Viktor Yanukovych was declared the winner which was labeled by some Yanukovych supporters as "an end to this Orange nightmare". Immediately after his election Yanukovych promised to "clear the debris of misunderstanding and old problems that emerged during the years of the Orange power". According to influential Party of Regions member Rinat Akhmetov the ideals of the Orange Revolution won at the 2010 election "We had a fair and democratic independent election. The entire world recognised it, and international observers confirmed its results. That's why the ideals of the Orange Revolution won". According to Yulia Tymoshenko the 2010 elections were a missed "chance to become a worthy member of the European family and to put an end to the rule of the oligarchy".

Legacy
President Viktor Yushchenko decreed in 2005 that 22 November (the starting day of the Orange Revolution) will be a non-public holiday "Day of Freedom". This date was moved to 22 January (and merged with Unification Day) by President Viktor Yanukovych late December 2011. President Yanukovych stated he moved "Day of Freedom" because of "numerous appeals from the public".

Outright vote rigging diminished after the 2004 presidential election. No officials involved in the 2004 elections that preceded the Orange Revolution were convicted for election fraud.

A 2007 research revealed that opinion about the nature of the Orange Revolution had barely shifted since 2004 and that the attitudes about it in the country remained divided along the same largely geographical lines that it had been at the time of the revolution (West and Central Ukraine being more positive about the events and South and Eastern Ukraine more cynical (seniors also)). This research (also) showed that Ukrainians in total had a less positive view on the Orange Revolution in 2007 than they had in 2005. It has been suggested that since the Orange Revolution was impactful enough to interest people of all ages it increased the overall unity of Ukraine.

During the elections campaign of the 2012 Ukrainian parliamentary election the Party of Regions' campaign focused heavily on (what they called) the chaos and ruins of 5 years of orange leadership.

Outside Ukraine

In March 2005 Ukrainian Foreign Minister Borys Tarasyuk stated that Ukraine would not be exporting revolution.

During Alexander Lukashenko's inauguration (ceremony) as President of Belarus of 22 January 2011 Lukashenko vowed that Belarus would never have its own version of the Orange Revolution and Georgia's 2003 Rose Revolution. In the aftermath of the 2011 South Ossetian presidential election (in December 2011) and during the protests following the 2011 Russian elections (also in December 2011) the Ambassador of South Ossetia to the Russian Federation Dmitry Medoyev and Russian Prime Minister Vladimir Putin and Putin's supporters named the Orange Revolution an infamous foreknowledge for their countries. Putin also claimed that the organisers of the Russian protests in December 2011 were former (Russian) advisors to Yushchenko during his presidency and were transferring the Orange Revolution to Russia. A 4 February 2012 rally in favor of Putin was named the "anti-Orange protest". In 2013 a Russian State Duma Oleg Nilov and former fellow Russian politician Sergey Glazyev referred to political adversaries as "different personalities in some sort of orange or bright shorts" and "diplomats and bureaucrats that appeared after the years of the 'orange' hysteria". In 2016 the Russian newspaper Izvestia claimed, "in Central Asia weak regimes are already being attacked by extremists and 'Orange Revolutions'."

In Russian nationalist circles the Orange Revolution has been linked with fascism because, albeit marginally, Ukrainian nationalist extreme right-wing groups and Ukrainian Americans (including Viktor Yushchenko's wife, Kateryna Yushchenko, who was born in the United States) were involved in the demonstrations; Russian nationalist groups see both as branches of the same tree of fascism. The involvement of Ukrainian Americans lead them to believe the Orange Revolution was steered by the CIA.

See also

Notes

References

Further reading

 Paul D'Anieri, ed. Orange Revolution and Aftermath: Mobilisation, Apathy, and the State in Ukraine (Johns Hopkins University Press; 2011) 328 pages
 Tetyana Tiryshkina. The Orange Revolution in Ukraine – a Step to Freedom (2nd ed. 2007)
 Andrew Wilson (March 2006). Ukraine's Orange Revolution. Yale University Press. .
 Anders Åslund and Michael McFaul (January 2006). Revolution in Orange: The Origins of Ukraine's Democratic Breakthrough. Carnegie Endowment for International Peace. .
 Askold Krushelnycky (2006). An Orange Revolution: A Personal Journey Through Ukrainian History. .
 Pavol Demes and Joerg Forbrig (eds.). Reclaiming Democracy: Civil Society and Electoral Change in Central and Eastern Europe. German Marshall Fund, 2007.
 Lehrke, Jesse Paul. "The Transition to National Armies in the Former Soviet Republics, 1988–2005." Oxfordshire, UK: Routledge (2013). Especially pp. 185–199 and pp. 152–159 for background. (See: http://www.routledge.com/books/details/9780415688369/ ).
 Andrey Kolesnikov (2005). Первый Украинский: записки с передовой (First Ukrainian [Front]: Notes from the Front Line). Moscow: Vagrius. . 
 Giuseppe D'Amato, EuroSogno e i nuovi Muri ad Est  (The Euro-Dream and the new Walls to the East). L'Unione europea e la dimensione orientale. Greco-Greco editore, Milano, 2008. pp. 133–151. 
 The Orange Ribbon: A Calendar of the Political Crisis in Ukraine, compiled by Wojciech Stanistawski. Warsaw: Centre for Eastern Studies (www.osw.waw.pl), 2005. by the Centre for Eastern Studies (OSW), Warsaw, 2005.
 US campaign behind the turmoil in Kiev , The Guardian, 2, 6 November 2004.
 Six questions to the critics of Ukraine's orange revolution , The Guardian, 2 December 2004.
 The Orange Revolution, Time.com, Monday, 6 December 2004 (excerpt, requires subscription)
 The price of People Power , The Guardian, 7 December 2004.
 U.S. Money has Helped Opposition in Ukraine , Associated Press, 11 December 2004.

External links

Orange Winter, a feature documentary about the Orange revolution by Andrei Zagdansky
"Role of Internet-based Information Flows and Technologies in Electoral Revolutions:The Case of Ukraine’s Orange Revolution", Lysenko, V.V., and Desouza, K.C., First Monday, 15 (9), 2010
 The Economic Policy of Ukraine after the Orange Revolution by Anders Åslund

 
Protests in Ukraine
Revolutions in Ukraine
Ukrainian democracy movements
2000s in Kyiv
Activism
Colour revolutions
Corruption in Ukraine
Electoral fraud in Ukraine
National revivals
Nonviolent revolutions
2004 in Ukraine
21st-century revolutions
History of Ukraine since 1991
Modern history of Ukraine
Political history of Ukraine
Political movements in Ukraine
Political scandals in Ukraine
Protests against results of elections
Riots and civil disorder in Ukraine
Social movements in Ukraine
November 2004 events in Europe
December 2004 events in Europe
January 2005 events in Europe
Viktor Yushchenko
Viktor Yanukovych